Cadet College is a residential special high school and college established in Bangladesh on the model of English public schools. It was put under the direct management and supervision of the armed forces of the country and military education was made compulsory in it. After liberation of Bangladesh, The Cadet Colleges Order (PO 89) of 1972 issued guidelines for restructuring the councils and governing bodies of the cadet colleges. According to new provisions, the Education Minister became the ex-officio chairman of the council and the divisional commissioner the chairman of the governing body. The Cadet College Act 1973 brought some changes in the provisions.
The two management bodies of the cadet colleges were further restructured and were placed under direct control of the Ministry of Defence. There have been periodic changes in the management structure because of changes in the government, but the basic principles have so far remained undisturbed. At present, the Adjutant General of the Bangladesh Army Acts, as the chairman of the governing bodies of all cadet colleges and the Defense Secretary is the highest authority in all matters relating to their funding and operation.

See also
Bangladesh Armed Forces
Education in Bangladesh

References

Military of Bangladesh
 
Bangladesh education-related lists